In mathematics and computer science, the critical exponent of a finite or infinite sequence of symbols over a finite alphabet describes the largest number of times a contiguous subsequence can be repeated.  For example, the critical exponent of "Mississippi" is 7/3, as it contains the string "ississi", which is of length 7 and period 3.

If w is an infinite word over the alphabet A and x is a finite word over A, then x is said to occur in w with exponent α, for positive real α, if there is a factor y of w with y = xax0 where x0 is a prefix of x, a is the integer part of α, and the length |y| = α |x|: we say that y is an  α-power.  The word w is  α-power-free if it contains no factors which are  β-powers for any β ≥ α.

The critical exponent for w is the supremum of the α for which w has α-powers, or equivalently the infimum of the α for which w is α-power-free.

Definition 
 
where .

Examples
 The critical exponent of the Fibonacci word is (5 + )/2 ≈ 3.618.
 The critical exponent of the Thue–Morse sequence is 2.  The word contains arbitrarily long squares, but in any factor xxb the letter b is not a prefix of x.

Properties
 The critical exponent can take any real value greater than 1.
 The critical exponent of a morphic word over a finite alphabet is either infinite or an algebraic number of degree at most the size of the alphabet.

Repetition threshold
The repetition threshold of an alphabet A of n letters is the minimum critical exponent of infinite words over A: clearly this value RT(n) depends only on n.  For n=2, any binary word of length four has a factor of exponent 2, and since the critical exponent of the Thue–Morse sequence is 2, the repetition threshold for binary alphabets is RT(2) = 2.  It is known that RT(3) = 7/4, RT(4) = 7/5 and that for n≥5 we have RT(n) ≥ n/(n-1).  It is conjectured that the latter is the true value, and this has been established for 5 ≤ n ≤ 14 and for n ≥ 33.

See also
 Critical exponent of a physical system

Notes

References

 
 

 
 

Formal languages
Combinatorics on words